Baiduri may refer to:

 Baiduri Bank (est. 1994), a bank in Brunei
 HD 20868 b (planet), Star Intan, Constellation Fornax; named after the Malay word for opal
 Desa Baiduri, Penang, Malaysia; a district in Paya Terubong (state constituency)
 Baiduri (BRT station), a station on the Iskandar Malaysia Bus Rapid Transit

See also

 Opal (disambiguation)